The Messerschmitt P.1111 was a jet fighter/interceptor project, designed by Messerschmitt for the Luftwaffe near the end of World War II.

History
The innovative design of the Me P.1111 was completed in January 1945, and was intended as an improvement to the Messerschmitt P.1110 Ente.

The Messerschmitt P.1111 was an 8.92 m long tailless airplane with nearly delta-shaped wings, swept back at a 45 degree angle, and a wingspan of 9.12 m. It was equipped with a pressurized cockpit for a single pilot. The planned powerplant was a Heinkel HeS 011 turbojet engine, and armament was to be four 30 mm MK 108 cannon.

During a design review comparison conference in Oberammergau on February 27 and 28, 1945 the P. 1111 fared outstanding in the area of performance in high-speed flight capability, take-off, climb and landing performance. The experts held the opinion that these qualities demonstrated a fundamental superiority of the flying wing construction type. However, the P.1111 was ruled out due to the impossibility of protecting the fuel.

Only one wooden model was built. The project was later further developed into the Me P.1112.

Specifications

See also
List of German aircraft projects, 1939–45

References

External links

"Wildgans", "Libelle", "Wespe", P.1106: bogus Messerschmitt Projects?

P.1111
1940s German fighter aircraft
Abandoned military aircraft projects of Germany
World War II jet aircraft of Germany